Mustafa Nail Bey (1861–1922) was an Ottoman liberal politician and minister during the Second Constitutional Era.

References 

1861 births
1922 deaths
Politicians of the Ottoman Empire